Ahmadabad (also Romanized as Aḩmadābād) is a village in Gavdul-e Gharbi Rural District, in the Central District of Malekan County, East Azerbaijan Province, Iran. At the 2006 census, its population was 382, in 99 families.

References 

fa;احمدآباد (ملکان)

Populated places in Malekan County